Neffex (stylized as NEFFEX) is an American music project by Bryce Savage (born Brandon Christopher Horth) that originally included Cameron Wales. They produced remixes and original songs characterized by a mixture of electronic and rap genres. Before Savage continued the project on his own, he wrote lyrics and sang while Wales created instrumentals and performed editing. They have released many of their songs royalty-free (under CC BY license) which have featured in media by content creators globally.

Career 
Savage and Wales first met in high school when they were 15 years old. At that time, they were involved in a punk rock band. Thereafter, both exited the band and started making their own music. However, this was not yet the creation of Neffex. After high school, Wales moved to Los Angeles and got distant from Savage during college. When Savage was in the last year of college, he talked to Wales and they noticed both were making music in their free time. After college, they got together again, in Orange County, and created the name "NEFFEX" and the fox symbol.On his YouTube channel Savage exclaimed that the fox symbol was not the original intention, instead, he wanted to make something that was easy to replicate similar to the infamous "cool S" style, hence why it consists of three triangles.

In 2017, the duo set up a challenge for releasing 100 songs in 100 weeks. All songs released for this challenge are royalty-free.

On October 16, 2019, they released their first EP titled Q203, named after the apartment where they recorded their first songs. The album has six songs: When I Was Young, Without You, It's My Life, Sunday, Primal, and Want Me.

On September 25, 2020, they released their debut album titled "New Beginnings" featuring ROZES, Jez Dior, and MASN. The album has 16 songs: Sometimes, Be Somebody, New Beginnings, Scars, I've been Let Down, Hell Won't Take Me, I Wanna Play A Game, Don't Hate Me, Mind Reader, Unavailable, When It Flows, WOW!, Worst of You, Closer to Heaven, Space, and I'll Be Fine.

On July 6, 2021, they mutually decided to part ways and each one focus on solo projects and Wales left NEFFEX.

On July 7, 2021, Savage set up a challenge for releasing 100 songs in 100 weeks again and same as before, all songs released for this challenge are royalty-free.

Discography 
The King Is Dead (2023)
Collapse (2023)
Tough Times (2023)
Made for This (2023)
A Place For Me (2023)
Conviction (2023)
 Before I'm Gone (2023)
 Never Gonna Stop (2023)
 At the top (2023)
Inside (2023)
POTUS (2023)
Get Out My Way (2022)
 This Is Not a Christmas Song - Ryan Oakes (2022)
 Back One Day (Outro Song) - TheFatRat (2022)
 New Year, New Me (2022)
 Stay Strong (Sofia's Song) (2022)
 The Rain (2022)
 Fever Dream (2022)
 Choose It (2022)
 Rise (2022)
 Purpose (2022)
 Big Swing (2022)
 Legendary (2022)
 Make Moves (2022)
 No Retreat (2022)
 Leading (2022)
 Ready To Kill (2022)
 Till My Hands Bleed (2022)
 My Mind (2022)
 Pinky Promise (2022)
 You Will Never See Me Coming (2022)
 6 Shots (2022)
 Anxiety (2022)
 Changing (2022)
 Till I'm On Top (2022)
 What You Gonna Be (2022)
 They Call Me A God (2022)
 Chasing (2022)
 Losing My Mind (2022)
 My Way (2022)
 Secrets (ft. Neffex) - PLVTINUM (2022)
 Don't Let Go (2022)
 Night Rider (ft. Neffex) - Frank Zummo (2022)
 Sober (ft. Neffex) - Josh A (2022)
 Catch Me If I Fall (2022)
 Tell Me What You Want (2022)
 A Little F*cked Up (2022)
 Price Tag (2022)
 Till I'm Free (2022)
 Play Dead (2022)
 As You Fade Away (2022)
 Ruthless (2022)
 Good Day (Wake Up) (2022)
 Go! (2022)
 Take Me Back (2022)
 Better Days (2022)
 Winning (2022)
 Built To Last (2022)
 Enough (2022)
 Get Through (2022)
 Immortal (2022)
 I Just Wanna Be Great (2022)
 No Filter (2022)
 Retribution (2022)
 Statement (2022)
 Tough (2022)
 Statement (2022)
 Enough (2022)
 Build To Last (2022)
 I Just Wanna Be Great (2022)
 Free Me (2021)
 Hustlin''' (2021) Dreaming On (2021)
 This Is Not A Christmas Song (2021)
 Just Breathing (2021)
 The Itch - Josh A (2021)
 Addict (2021)
 Don't Wanna Let Myself Down (2021)
 Manifest It (2021)
 Born A Rockstar (2021)
 How's It Supposed To Feel (2021)
 Tell Me That I Can't (2021)
 Till I Let Go (2021)
 TILL I HEAR 'EM SAY (2021)
 A YEAR AGO (2021)
 INSPIRED (2021)
 IT'S ONLY WORTH IT IF YOU WORK FOR IT (2021)
 SOMETHING YOU COULD NEVER OWN (2021)
 FOYF (2021)
 BITE ME (2021)
 BELIEVE (2021)
 THAT'S WHAT IT TAKES  (2021)
 NO TURNING BACK (2021)
 REVOLUTION (2021)
 Are You Ok? (2021)
 Time (2021)
 Scars (2020)
 Hell Won't Take Me (2020)
 I've Been Let Down (2020)
 Be Somebody - ROZES (2020)
 Mind Reader - MASN (2020)
 Closer to Heaven (2020)
 When It Flows (2020)
 Unavailable (2020)
 WOW! (2020)
 I'll Be Fine (Bonus) (2020)
 I Wanna Play A Game - Jez Dior (2020)
 Sometimes (2020)
 Worst Of You (2020)
 I'm Not Worth It (2020)
 New Beginings (2020)
 Space (2020)
 When I Was Young (2019)
 Want Me (2019)
 Primal (2019)
 Without You (2019)
 Sunday (2019)
 It's My Life (2019)
 Coming For You (2019)
 Torn Apart (2019)
 Lose My Mind (2019)
 When Everything Is Gone (2019)
 Cold (2019)
 Destiny (2019)
 Cold in the Water (2019)
 Trapped in a Nightmare (2019)
 Here To Stay (2019)
 Myself (2019)
 100 (Count It) (2019)
 Its Just Not Fair (2018)
 We Could Do It All (2018)
 Runaway (2018)
 Make It (2018)
 Spartan (2018)
 Keep Dreaming (2018)
 Struggle (2018)
 Lost Within (2018)
 Deep Thoughts (2018)
 Home (2018)
 Mystify (2018)
 Take Me Back Again (2018)
 What's Up (2018)
 Lost Not Found (2018)
 Damn Gurl (2018)
 Play (2018)
 Hate It or Love It (2018)
 The Show (2018)
 Broken Dreams (2018)
 Mirror (2018)
 One Shot (2018)
 Numb (2018)
 Fall Asleep (2018)
 Climb (2018)
 Fade Away (2018)
 Fear (2018)
 So Fine (2018)
 Trust Me (2018)
 Take Me Away (2018)
 Alive (2018)
 All These Thoughts (2018)
 GOT THIS (2018)
 Dangerous (2018)
 Comeback (2018)
 Chance (2018)
 Summertime (2018)
 A Feeling (2018)
 Touch The Sky (2018)
 Cold (2018)
 Go Hard (2018)
 Hope (2018)
 R.I.P. (2018)
 Graveyard (2018)
 Blessed (2018)
 Grateful (2018)
 Hype (2018)
 Deep in the Game (2018)
 Can't Lose (2018)
 Savage (2018)
 Forget 'em (2018)
 Gibberish (2018)
 Nightmare (2018)
 Greatest (2017)
 Roller Coaster (2017)
 Pro (2017)
 Judge (2017)
 Life (2017)
 Baller (2017)
 Let Me Down (2017)
 Dance Again (2017)
 Hungover (2017)
 Fight Back (2017)
 No Sleep (2017)
 Flirt (2017)
 Soldier (2017)
 One of a Kind (2017)
 Badass (2017)
 Self Made (2017)
 Unstoppable (2017)
 Shmack'd (2017)
 Never Hold Back (2017)
 First Time (2017)
 Never Give Up (2017)
 Head Down (2017)
 Ready To Go (2017)
 Welcome To The City (2017)
 Best of Me (2017)
 Watch Me (2017)
 Backstage (2017)
 Fight (2017)
 Careless (2017)
 Party Like the 80s (2017)
 Dream Catcher (2017)
 Woah (2017)
 Crown (2017)
 Things Are Gonna Get Better (2017)
 Hey Yea (2017)
 Rumors (2017)
 Failure (2017)
 Who The F*ck is NEFFEX!? (2017)
 Blow Up (2017)
 Destiny (2017)
 Light It Up (2017)
 LIT (2017)
 Sober (2017)
 Gossip (2017)
 Hometown (2017)
 Tonight (2017)
 SUMMER (2017)
 Bros B4 Hoes (2017)
 Jingle Bells (2016)
 Messed up (2016)
 Memories (2016)
 IF JAUZ PLAYED GUITER (2016)
 The Chainsmokers - All We Know (NEFFEX Remix) (2016) 
 The Chainsmokers - Closer (NEFFEX Remix) (2016) 
 DJ Khaled - For Free ft. Drake (NEFFEX Remix) (2016) 
 Fifth Harmony - All In My Head (NEFFEX Remix) (Flex) (2016) 
 EMIN3M- 'Till I Collapse (NEFFEX Remix) (2016)
 Iggy Azalea - Team (NEFFEX Remix) (2016) 
 Marshmello - WroNg (NEFFEX Remix) (2016)
 Slushii - Deeper Love (NEFFEX Remix) (2016) 
 Dotcom - Click (NEFFEX Remix) (2016)
 Grandtheft & Keys N Krates - Keep It 100 (NEFFEX Remix) (2016)
 Ariana Grande - Dangerous Woman (NEFFEX Remix) (2016)
 JACKAL - OHUMAD (NEFFEX Remix) (2016)
 graves & FELMAX - Zebras In America (NEFFEX Remix) (2016)
 Lookas - Voyager (NEFFEX Remix) (2016)
 Tomsize & Creaky Jackals - Fly (NEFFEX Remix) (2016)
 We The Kings - Check Yes Juliet (NEFFEX Remix) (2016)
 Wes Walker - Jordan Belfort (NEFFEX Festival Trap Remix) (2016)
 BLVK SHEEP ✖ AMF - Hydra (NEFFEX Remix) (2016)
 KILLA'' (2016)

References

External links 

 Official website

American electronic music duos
American dance music groups
Electronic dance music duos
Hip hop groups from California
Musical groups from Los Angeles
Hip hop duos
Electronic music groups from California